Occupied Bosnia and Herzegovina may refer to:

 Ottoman Bosnia and Herzegovina#Ottoman Rule, (1463-1878)
 Austro-Hungarian rule in Bosnia and Herzegovina, following the Congress of Berlin of 1878
 Bosnia and Herzegovina#World War II (1941–45), occupation by Independent State of Croatia, a Nazi puppet state

See also
 Ottoman Bosnia and Herzegovina
 Counties of the Independent State of Croatia